The Malabar starling (Sturnia blythii) is a species of starling found in southwestern India. It was previously considered a subspecies of the chestnut-tailed starling.

References
Rasmussen, P.C., and J.C. Anderton. 2005. Birds of South Asia. The Ripley guide. Volume 2: attributes and status. Smithsonian Institution and Lynx Edicions, Washington D.C. and Barcelona.

External links

Malabar starling
Malabar starling
Birds of South India
Malabar starling